Personally Yours is an Australian television series which aired on ABC during 1962. Horrie Dargie was the host. It was a variety series produced in Melbourne. Each episode featured a different star.

Some of the episodes (along with still photographs) are held by the National Archives of Australia.

Guests
Guests on Personally Yours include Randy Ross, Les Patching, Mary Hardy, Vikki Hammond, Johnny Rohan, Bob Hornery Joan Clarke, Reg Gray, Johnny Kendall, Terry Holden, Gaynor Bunning, and Jon Finlayson.

References

External links
Personally Yours on IMDb

1962 Australian television series debuts
1962 Australian television series endings
Black-and-white Australian television shows
English-language television shows
Australian variety television shows
Australian Broadcasting Corporation original programming